Jennifer Elizabeth Pike  (born 9 November 1989) is a British violinist.

Early years and education
Pike began playing the violin at the age of five, and after auditioning at the age of eight she gained a place at Chetham's School of Music in Manchester. At the age of ten she was chosen to play at a concert attended by the Prince of Wales at the Royal Opera House, Covent Garden. She soon made her concerto debut, playing Haydn's Violin Concerto in G with her school orchestra. Her professional orchestra debut was with The Hallé at Bridgewater Hall aged 11.

In 2002 Pike became the thirteenth person to win the BBC Young Musician of the Year Award, following her performance of Mendelssohn's Violin Concerto with the BBC Symphony Orchestra conducted by Sir Andrew Davis. Aged twelve at the time, she was the youngest ever winner of the competition until six years later. Earlier the same year she also won fourth prize in the Junior Section of the Yehudi Menuhin International Violin Competition, making her the youngest major prize-winner of the Competition.

At age 16, she was awarded a scholarship to study at the Guildhall School of Music and Drama. She graduated with First Class Honours in Music from Lady Margaret Hall, Oxford in 2012, where she is now the Artist-In-Residence.

Pike was a member of the BBC Radio 3 New Generation Artists scheme from 2008–2010.

Career highlights
Following her success in the BBC Young Musician of the Year, Pike has played in concerts and recitals in major venues all over the world. In July 2005 she took part in the BBC Proms in the Royal Albert Hall, and in November 2005 she made her evening recital debut in the Wigmore Hall, both to great critical acclaim.

In 2009, Pike was a BBC Proms featured artist. She then took part in the 'Night of the Proms' 2016 tour to Poland, where she performed at the Atlas Arena in Łódź to an audience of 11,000, which was also broadcast on Polish TV.

On 19 April 2012, she took part in a live concert in Glasgow, accompanied by the BBC Scottish Symphony Orchestra under the direction of Andrew Manze. The programme, which was aired through BBC Radio 3, included music of Bach and Vaughan Williams.

On 4 August 2014, Pike performed Vaughan Williams's The Lark Ascending at the service of commemoration for the 100th anniversary of World War I at Westminster Abbey.

In 2015 and 16, Pike toured of Mexico with the London Philharmonic Orchestra, performing with the Oslo Philharmonic as part of the Sibelius festival 150th year celebrations and performing as a director and soloist with the BBC Philharmonic. She also took part in a broadcast performance of Schindler's List as part of BBC Two's Holocaust Memorial Day tribute, as well as a live broadcast on Classic FM for the Queen's 90th Birthday celebration concert.

Pike was appointed Member of the Order of the British Empire (MBE) in the 2020 Birthday Honours for services to classical music.

Contemporary music and commissions
In 2017 Pike curated 'Polish Music Day' at Wigmore Hall in London, featuring three concerts of Polish music including a specially commissioned work by contemporary Polish composer Paulina Załubska, and the UK premiere of Krzysztof Penderecki’s Capriccio for solo violin.

Pike has had many pieces written specially for her, such as Hafliði Hallgrímsson’s Violin Concerto, which she premiered with the Iceland Symphony Orchestra and Scottish Chamber Orchestra. Other commissions for Pike include Andrew Schultz’s Violin Concerto and Sonatina for solo violin, and Charlotte Bray’s Scenes from Wonderland, premiered with the London Philharmonic Orchestra at Royal Festival Hall in London.

In celebration of the 40th anniversary of BBC Young Musician, Pike performed the world premiere performance of David Bruce's 'Sidechaining' as part of a BBC commission for four soloists and orchestra at the 2018 Proms. She was joined by fellow BBC Young Musician winners Nicholas Daniel, Michael Collins and Ben Goldscheider, performing with the BBC Concert Orchestra under Andrew Gourlay.

In 2020 Pike performed the world premiere of a piece by composer Dani Howard called 'Dualism' for violin and piano. Written specifically for Pike and pianist Martin Roscoe, the piece received its premiere at Wigmore Hall in January 2020.

Charitable work
Pike works with multiple charities across the UK, and is an acting ambassador for The Prince's Foundation for Children and the Arts, The Prince's Trust, London Music Masters, City Music Foundation and The Wellspring in her home town of Stockport.

She also spoke out in support for the performing arts following the Covid-19 pandemic, including a performance on the steps of Manchester Central Library with Vanessa Redgrave to bring media attention to the plight of struggling artists.

Discography
Her extensive discography includes recordings with Chandos, Sony and ABC Classics. She has recorded with the Bergen Symphony and Sir Andrew Davis, the BBC Philharmonic and Rumon Gamba, the Tasmanian Symphony Orchestra and the City of Birmingham Symphony and Edward Gardner.

Albums

References

External links
Jennifer Pike home page
Yehudi Menuhin International Competition for Young Violinists

English classical violinists
1989 births
Living people
People from Cheadle Hulme
People educated at Chetham's School of Music
Eurovision Young Musicians Finalists
BBC Radio 3 New Generation Artists
English people of Polish descent
21st-century classical violinists
Women classical violinists
Members of the Order of the British Empire
Alumni of Lady Margaret Hall, Oxford